R&B Transmogrification is an album by the American indie band Quasi. It was released on March 25, 1997, on Up Records.

Critical reception
Record Collector wrote that the album is "clever from the get-go; between their heavily distorted rocksichord (a kind of electronic keyboard made to approximate the sound of a harpsichord) and lyricism that tells of the worst kind of heartbreak, there’s a sort of commercial viability without selling the soul of these songs." Trouser Press thought that "the imaginative music includes everything commercial pop lacks: the pioneering spirit navigating a sinking ship, violations of civilized taste and neurotic condemnations."

Track listing
All tracks by Sam Coomes except "Bird's Eye View" by Janet Weiss and Coomes.
 "Ghost Dreaming" – 3:24
 "Ballad of Mechanical Man" – 3:13
 "In the First Place" – 4:02
 "Bird's Eye View" – 3:23
 "Two-Faced" – 2:53
 "Ghost vs. Vampire" – 3:26
 "R&B Transmogrification" – 2:29
 "When I'm Dead" – 2:20
 "Sugar" – 5:27
 "My Coffin" – 3:59
 "Mama, Papa, Baby" – 2:59
 "Chocolate Rabbit" – 3:24
 "Iron Worm" – 3:18
 "Clouds" – 2:52

Personnel 
Sam Coomes – vocals, guitars, Roxichord, keyboards
Janet Weiss – vocals, drums
Charlie Campbell – recording engineer, mixing
Quasi – recording engineer, mixing
Tony Lash – mastering

References

1997 albums
Quasi albums